Ross High School may refer to:
 Ross High School (Hamilton, Ohio)
 Ross High School, Tranent, Scotland
 Fremont Ross High School, Fremont, Ohio
 The Ross Building section of Brentwood High School (Brentwood, New York)